Gudari Airstrip, also known as Phulbani Airstrip,  is a public airstrip owned by Government of Odisha located at Phulbani in the Kandhamal district of Odisha. Nearest airport/airstrip to this airstrip is Nuagaon Airstrip in Balangir, Odisha.

References

Airports in Odisha
Kandhamal district
Airports with year of establishment missing